Giacomo Tomaselli (born 25 July 1999) is an Italian professional footballer who plays as a winger for  club Entella.

Career 
On 24 January 2018, Tomaselli joined Serie C club Monza from Borgosesia. On 9 July 2019, he moved to Gozzano on loan. On 11 August 2020, AlbinoLeffe announced the signing of Tomaselli on a permanent deal.

On 30 January 2023, Tomaselli signed with Entella.

References

External links 
 
 

1999 births
Living people
People from Borgosesia
Sportspeople from the Province of Vercelli
Footballers from Piedmont
Italian footballers
Association football wingers
A.C. Monza players
A.C. Gozzano players
U.C. AlbinoLeffe players
Virtus Entella players
Serie D players
Serie C players